Shoot Out at the Fantasy Factory is the sixth studio album by English rock band Traffic released in 1973. It followed their 1971 album The Low Spark of High Heeled Boys and contained five songs. Shoot Out, while achieving poorer reviews than its predecessor, did reach number six on the Billboard Pop Albums chart, one space higher than Low Spark had peaked in 1972. Like its predecessor, the original jacket for the Shoot Out LP had its top right and bottom left corners clipped. The album was remastered for CD in 2003.

The album was recorded with four members of the Muscle Shoals Rhythm Section (bassist David Hood, drummer Roger Hawkins, keyboardist Barry Beckett, and guitarist Jimmy Johnson). Hood and Hawkins appear on all the songs, and are listed as members of Traffic on the album sleeve. Beckett and Johnson only play on "Tragic Magic". Hood, Hawkins & Beckett would go on tour with the band as evidenced by the subsequent On the Road album.

Reception

Rolling Stone had a subdued reaction, saying that most of the songs are too even-tempered and uniform in structure and tone, but that "Evening Blue" and "(Sometimes I Feel So) Uninspired" are high points. They summarized that the album "embodies the inconsistencies that beset the band as well as the high points that have kept Traffic moving."

Retrospective reviews were less forgiving, with AllMusic stating that both the compositions and the performances are uniformly weak, adding up to "a competent, if perfunctory effort in the band's familiar style", while Village Voice critic Robert Christgau's review consisted of a single sentence followed by the note 'Giveaway: "(Sometimes I Feel So) Uninspired."'

Track listing

Versions of the album
The original, full-length master of Shoot Out at the Fantasy Factory was initially only heard on the U.S. vinyl version. This was at a time when Island Records was manufactured and distributed by Capitol Records. When Island's distribution deal with Capitol ended, Traffic submitted a revised master in which "Roll Right Stones" and "Uninspired" were remixed and faded out early. "Uninspired" was shortened by about 15 seconds and "Roll Right Stones" by a full two minutes. This shortened master was used for all subsequent copies of the album until May 2003. With Island's 2003 remaster of the album, the original full-length versions of these songs finally became available on CD. LPs and CDs with the shortened versions of these songs commonly falsely list the longer times for them.

Personnel

Traffic 
 Steve Winwood – lead and backing vocals, acoustic piano, organ, guitars 
 Chris Wood – saxophones, flute
 David Hood – bass 
 Roger Hawkins – drums
 Jim Capaldi – percussion, backing vocals (2)
 Rebop Kwaku Baah – percussion

Additional personnel 
 Barry Beckett – keyboards (4)
 Jimmy Johnson – clarinet (4)

Production 
 Steve Winwood – producer 
 Jim Capaldi – producer 
 Jerry Masters – engineer 
 Steve Melton – engineer
 Tony Wright – cover illustrations 
 Tommy Wright – photography

Charts

Weekly charts

Year-end charts

Certifications

References

External links 

 Shoot Out at the Fantasy Factory (1973) album releases & credits at Discogs.com
 Traffic – Shoot Out at the Fantasy Factory (1973) album user reviews & credits at ProgArchives.com
 Shoot Out at the Fantasy Factory (1973) album review by William Ruhlmann, credits, releases and Billboard charts at AllMusic.com

Traffic (band) albums
1973 albums
Island Records albums
Albums produced by Steve Winwood